Accra ornata is a species of moth of the family Tortricidae. It is found in Gabon.

References

Endemic fauna of Gabon
Moths described in 1966
Tortricini
Moths of Africa